The NT Indigenous Music Awards 2008 are the 5th annual National Indigenous Music Awards. 

The awards ceremony was held on 30 August 2008.

Performers
The Kenbi Dancers opened the award evening
WildWater
Tom E Lewis, Roy Ashley and Micky Hall.
The Saltwater Band and Chooky Dancers from Elcho Island.

Hall of Fame Inductee 
 Peter Miller and Blek Bala Mujik, Mark Raymond and the Kulumindini Band

Special Recognition Award
 Galarrwuy Yunupingu and Mr Nundhirribala

Awards
Act of the Year

Emerging Act of the Year

Album of the Year

DVD/Film Clip of the Year

Song of the Year

Artwork of the Year

Gospel Album of the Year

Traditional Music Award

Most Popular Song

School Band of the Year

References

2008 in Australian music
2008 music awards
National Indigenous Music Awards